Galatasaray Küçükçekmece Rowing Center is the training center of Galatasaray Rowing Team. It is located at Küçükçekmece, İstanbul.

References

Galatasaray S.K. facilities